Aloïs Dansou (born 1982) is an Olympic swimmer from Benin. He swam for Benin at the:
Olympics: 2004, 2008
World Championships: 2003, 2007
African Swimming Championships: 2004

References

Living people
Beninese male swimmers
Olympic swimmers of Benin
Swimmers at the 2004 Summer Olympics
Swimmers at the 2008 Summer Olympics
1982 births